Negaunee (  or  ) is a city in Marquette County in the U.S. state of Michigan. The population was 4,627 at the 2020 census. The city is located at the southwest corner of Negaunee Township, which is administratively separate, in the Upper Peninsula. The city is home to a luge track. The name Negaunee comes from an Anishinabemowin (Ojibwa) word , meaning "foremost, in advance, leading," which was determined to be the closest Ojibwa translation for "pioneer". Within the city limits is Teal Lake.

History
The city was built after the discovery of the Marquette Iron Range during the early 19th century. The Jackson Mine was established in 1845 to mine the ore for shipment to iron forges; the first such forge to operate in the Lake Superior basin was set up in Negaunee during this period. In 1858, the community was given a post office. In 1865, Negaunee was incorporated as a village and reincorporated as a city in 1873. As mining operations expanded, many immigrants helped settle the area, bringing with them rich traditions that remain today. Due to extensive underground mining roughly half the city was abandoned in the early 20th century due to risk of cave-in. The city closed its trolley system in 1927. The Jackson Mine ceased all operations within the city limits in the 1940s.

On January 16, 1952, Negaunee became the smallest city to ever host an NBA game.  The Milwaukee Hawks beat the Baltimore Bullets 77-71.  Baltimore's Don Barksdale led all scorers with 24 points.  Negaunee is still the smallest city to ever host any of the four major North American professional sports.

Geography
Negaunee sits on the eastern shore of Teal Lake, all of which is considered within the city borders.

Attractions

The Michigan Iron Industry Museum is located near the Carp River on the outskirts of Negaunee.  Negaunee is home to Pioneer Days, a festival held every year the week following July 4.

Negaunee is the home of the only full-length natural-track luge course in the United States, maintained by the Upper Peninsula Luge Club. A section near the finish line is open to public sliding in the wintertime, using club equipment.

Negaunee is also the home of Suicide Hill Ski Jump, a ski jump training facility where the Ishpeming Ski Club prepares skiers for classic cross country skiing, Nordic combined, and ski jumping competitions.

The county's Heritage Trails pass through Negaunee where visitors can stroll, hike, bike, and snowmobile through Old Town Negaunee and around various collapsed underground mines from last century. The Negaunee portion of the trail also includes a new disc golf course.

Transportation

Highways
  passes through the northern portion of Negaunee, running westerly and northerly toward Houghton, easterly toward Marquette and southeast to Escanaba.
  travels westerly toward Wakefield and east to Marquette.
  Bus. M-28 serves the downtowns of both Negaunee and Ishpeming.
  provides an alternate route to the Escanaba area and access to Sawyer International Airport.

Bus
Indian Trails bus lines operates daily intercity bus service between Hancock and Milwaukee, Wisconsin, with a stop in Negaunee.

Demographics

2010 census
As of the census of 2010, there were 4,568 people, 1,940 households, and 1,219 families residing in the city. The racial makeup of the city was 96.6% White, 0.1% African American, 1.1% Native American, 0.3% Asian, 0.2% from other races, and 1.7% from two or more races. Hispanic or Latino of any race were 1.1% of the population.

There were 1,940 households, of which 30.6% had children under the age of 18 living with them, 47.1% were married couples living together, 10.9% had a female householder with no husband present, 4.8% had a male householder with no wife present, and 37.2% were non-families. 31.7% of all households were made up of individuals, and 13.8% had someone living alone who was 65 years of age or older. The average household size was 2.30 and the average family size was 2.90.

The median age in the city was 39.7 years. 23.9% of residents were under the age of 18; 8% were between the ages of 18 and 24; 24.4% were from 25 to 44; 27.2% were from 45 to 64; and 16.7% were 65 years of age or older. The gender makeup of the city was 47.4% male and 52.6% female.

2000 census
As of the census of 2000, there were 4,576 people, 1,946 households, and 1,218 families residing in the city. The racial makeup of the city was 96.63% White, 0.28% African American, 1.29% Native American, 0.22% Asian, 0.13% from other races, and 1.44% from two or more races. Hispanic or Latino of any race were 0.44% of the population. 28.8% were of Finnish, 14.5% Italian, 14.0% English, 9.3% German, 8.9% Swedish and 5.8% French ancestry according to Census 2000. 95.7% spoke English, 1.7% Spanish and 1.5% Finnish as their first language.

There were 1,946 households, out of which 27.4% had children under the age of 18 living with them, 49.4% were married couples living together, 9.0% had a female householder with no husband present, and 37.4% were non-families. 33.0% of all households were made up of individuals, and 16.6% had someone living alone who was 65 years of age or older. The average household size was 2.30 and the average family size was 2.93.

In the city, the population was spread out, with 22.3% under the age of 18, 9.1% from 18 to 24, 25.9% from 25 to 44, 23.8% from 45 to 64, and 18.8% who were 65 years of age or older. The median age was 40 years. For every 100 females, there were 92.0 males. For every 100 females age 18 and over, there were 89.7 males.

The median income for a household in the city was $33,117, and the median income for a family was $39,750. Males had a median income of $36,026 versus $22,380 for females. The per capita income for the city was $16,889. About 6.3% of families and 9.4% of the population were below the poverty line, including 11.7% of those under age 18 and 5.6% of those age 65 or over.

Education

The Negaunee school system, Negaunee Public Schools, ranked in the top 20% of schools for the State of Michigan in 2008.

Negaunee Public Schools consists of three main buildings: Lakeview Elementary, which has K-4th grades; Negaunee Middle School, which has 5th through 8th grade; and Negaunee High School, which has 9th through 12th grade. Negaunee athletics have a large, healthy rivalry with the Westwood Patriots (in Football and Basketball). A small, but relevant rivalry exists with the Calumet Copper Kings (Football) and Iron Mountain Mountaineers (Basketball).

St. Paul's Catholic School was formerly in Negaunee. Closure was proposed in 1974.

Climate
This climatic region is typified by large seasonal temperature differences, with warm to hot (and often humid) summers and cold (sometimes severely cold) winters. According to the Köppen Climate Classification system, Negaunee has a humid continental climate, abbreviated "Dfb" on climate maps. The average window for freezing temperatures is September 23 thru May 26, allowing a growing season of 120 days.

Precipitation is moderate, averaging  annually, with September and October being the wettest months, and the meteorological winter months of December thru February being the driest in terms of normal total precipitation. On average, measurable snow occurs between October 14 and April 28, with accumulating snow in May occurring around half of the time; accumulating snow in September is much rarer, occurring on average once per decade.

Notable people
Mark Ayotte (born 1964), National Basketball Association referee
Edward Breitung (1831–1887), Michigan State House of Representatives member
Bob Chase (1926–2016), sports commentator
Dominic Jacobetti (1920–1994), Michigan State House of Representatives member
Joan LeQuia (born 1937), All-American Girls Professional Baseball League player
Steven Wiig (born 1972), film actor and musician
Sarah York, became penpal of Manuel Noriega at age 10

References

External links
City of Negaunee Site
Negaunee Schools Site

Cities in Marquette County, Michigan
Populated places established in 1846
1846 establishments in Michigan